Garraty is a surname. Notable people with the surname include:

 Billy Garraty (1878–1931), English footballer
 John A. Garraty (1920–2007), American historian and biographer
 Raymond Garraty

See also
 Garrity